The 45th Chess Olympiad, organised by the Fédération Internationale des Échecs (FIDE) and comprising open and women's tournaments, as well as several events designed to promote the game of chess, will be held in Budapest, Hungary from 10 to 23 September 2024. It will be the first Chess Olympiad to take place in Hungary after Budapest hosted the 2nd unofficial Chess Olympiad in 1926.

Bidding process 
The bidding procedure for the Chess Olympiad 2024 and the FIDE Congress in connection with bids for the Women's World Cup 2022 and Chess World Cup 2023 was opened in November 2019. Each city interested to host the event had to submit their bid to FIDE by 31 March 2016. The bids were to guarantee that all necessary provisions in accordance with the Olympiad Regulations of the FIDE Handbook would be covered by the organiser, including articles 4.1, 4.2 and 4.3 pertaining to the organising committee, finances, and provision of amenities and stipends, respectively. There was only one bid to host the Chess Olympiad in Budapest, which was approved by the FIDE General Assembly in December 2020. Hungarian political authorities, chess players as well as prominent members of the Olympic movement and the sports administration have expressed their unconditional support to the event.

Change of numbering 
The 45th Chess Olympiad was originally scheduled to take place in Minsk in 2022, but FIDE decided to move it from there and re-open the bid after the Belarusian organisers fail to accomplish their organisational and financial duties. After failing to find an alternative host for the event in 2022, FIDE decided to move the 44th Chess Olympiad from 2021 to 2022, so the event scheduled for 2024 in Budapest will be the 45th Chess Olympiad.

Preparations 
The provisional total budget for the Chess Olympiad is €16.6 million, including €9 million for event services and operations as well as the hosting fee. In June 2021, FIDE President Arkady Dvorkovich together with the president of the Hungarian Chess Federation László Szabó and the executive director of the National Sports Agency of Hungary Attila Mihok signed the contract for the event in Budapest. The organisers of the event intend to make it an innovative Olympiad by introducing new technologies, such as a 5G high-speed wireless network, a real-time visual broadcast, holograms and newly invented "sensitive" chess boards for the visually impaired. It was announced to be a "green" Olympiad with the possibility of transfers between the venues and the hotels with bicycles and electric vehicles as well as by avoiding paper and plastic.

Venue 
The venue for the event will be the renovated Hungexpo Exhibition and Conference Centre.

See also 

 Chess Olympiad
 2nd unofficial Chess Olympiad

Notes

References 

Chess Olympiads
Chess in Hungary
2024 in chess
Sport in Budapest
International sports competitions hosted by Hungary